In mathematics, particularly in group theory, the Frattini subgroup  of a group  is the intersection of all maximal subgroups of . It is analogous to the Jacobson radical in the theory of rings, and intuitively can be thought of as the subgroup of "small elements" (see the "non-generator" characterization below). It is named after Giovanni Frattini, who defined the concept in a paper published in 1885.

Some facts
 If  is finite, then  is nilpotent.
 If  is a finite p-group, then . Thus the Frattini subgroup is the smallest (with respect to inclusion) normal subgroup N such that the quotient group  is an elementary abelian group, i.e., isomorphic to a direct sum of cyclic groups of order p. In particular a finite p-group is cyclic if and only if its Frattini quotient is cyclic (of order p). A finite p-group is elementary abelian if and only if its Frattini subgroup is the trivial group, .

An example of a group with nontrivial Frattini subgroup is the cyclic group  of order , where p is prime, generated by a, say; here, .

See also
Fitting subgroup
Frattini's argument
Socle

References

   (See Chapter 10, especially Section 10.4.)

Group theory
Functional subgroups